Michigan Theater or Michigan Theatre may refer to: 

 Michigan Theater (Ann Arbor, Michigan)
 Michigan Theatre (Detroit)
 Michigan Theatre (Jackson, Michigan)
 Frauenthal Theater (Muskegon) (former name, Michigan Theater)